Events in the year 1927 in Portugal.

Incumbents
President: Óscar Carmona 
Prime Minister: Óscar Carmona

Events
April - Establishment of the Order of Public Instruction

Sport
22 January - Establishment of the Portuguese Chess Federation
20 March - Establishment of S.L. Benfica (basketball)
12 June - Campeonato de Portugal Final
17 August - Establishment of the Federação Portuguesa de Basquetebol
Establishment of the Federação Portuguesa de Vela
Establishment of F.C. Marco
Establishment of the Volta a Portugal
Establishment of the Falperra International Hill Climb

Births
24 February - David Mourão-Ferreira, writer, poet (died 1996)
1 March - Ruy de Carvalho, actor
10 March - Raúl Figueiredo, footballer
9 April - Francisco Rocha, footballer
30 June - António Jonet, modern pentathlete (died 2007)
26 July - Matateu, footballer
27 July - Adelaide João, actress
27 August - António Reis,  film director, screenwriter, producer, poet, sculptor, ethnographer (died 1991)
29 August - Bentes, footballer
3 September - João Baptista Martins, footballer (died 1993)
8 December - José Manuel de Mello, businessman (died 2009)
Carlos Montez Melancia, Governor of Macau 
Francisco Martins Rodrigues, anti-Fascist resistant (died 2008)
Lima de Freitas, painter, illustrator, ceramicist, writer (died 1998)
Luísa Dacosta, writer
Manuel Cargaleiro, artist

Deaths
15 June - Manuel António Lino, medic, politician, poet, dramatist (born 1865)
21 September - José Maria de Sousa Horta e Costa, soldier, politician, diplomat (born 1858)
11 October - Miguel, Duke of Braganza, Miguelist claimant to the throne of Portugal (born 1853)
15 October - Lucrécia de Arriaga, First Lady of Portugal (born 1844)
João Marques de Oliveira, painter (born 1853)

References

 
Years of the 20th century in Portugal